Hunter Jaegers were an Australian netball team based in Newcastle, New South Wales. Together with Sydney Swifts and Sydney Sandpipers, they were one of three teams to represent Netball New South Wales in the Commonwealth Bank Trophy league. Hunter Jaegers made their CBT debut in 2004. They continued to play in the competition until its demise in 2007. In 2008, when the Commonwealth Bank Trophy was replaced by the ANZ Championship, Jaegers and Swifts  merged to form New South Wales Swifts.

Final placings

Home venues
During the 2004 and 2005 seasons, Jaegers played their home games at the Newcastle Entertainment Centre.

Notable former players

Internationals

 Jane Altschwager
 Karyn Bailey

 Courtney Tairi
 Daneka Wipiiti

New South Wales Swifts
 Emma Koster
 Tiffany Lincoln
 Jessica Mansell
 Kimberley Purcell

ANZ Championship
 Karyn Bailey
 Kirby Bentley 
 Katie Walker

Captains

Head coaches

Sponsorship

References

Defunct netball teams in Australia
Sport in Newcastle, New South Wales
New South Wales Swifts
Netball teams in New South Wales
Commonwealth Bank Trophy teams
2003 establishments in Australia
Sports clubs established in 2003
2007 disestablishments in Australia
Sports clubs disestablished in 2007